A list of animated feature films that were first released in 1971.

See also
 List of animated television series of 1971

References

Feature films
1971
1971-related lists